Loveta Cheralyn "Chera-Lyn" Cook (born October 7, 1976) is an American crowned Miss Kentucky 1998, was the first young woman from southeast Kentucky to win the Miss Kentucky title.

Pageants
Representing the title of Miss Lexington, but claiming London, Kentucky as her hometown, Cook had previously held several titles, including Miss Central Kentucky, Miss Fayette County, Miss Monticello, Miss Southeast Kentucky, National Sweetheart, and National All American Teen.  A double preliminary winner at Miss Kentucky, Cook won talent preliminary and placed 4th runner-up to Miss America 1999.

Awards and recognitions
Cook was recognized by the Joint Sessions of the Kentucky Legislature for volunteer work with at-risk youth and was the Kentucky School Psychologist of the Year in 2004. Her platform issue at Miss America, Children's Miracle Network, was later adopted by the Miss America Scholarship Organization as a national platform. She was also a Goodwill Ambassador for the Commonwealth of Kentucky.

References

External links
 
 
 
 'Blue' album on iTunes

1976 births
Living people
Beauty pageants in Kentucky
Miss America 1999 delegates
People from London, Kentucky
Miss Kentucky winners
20th-century American people
21st-century American women